The  is an electric multiple unit (EMU) train type for Chichibu Main Line local services on the Chichibu Main Line operated by the private railway operator Chichibu Railway in Japan since March 2010.

Overview
The three-car trains were converted from former Tokyu 8090 series cars. Conversion details include modifications for wanman driver-only operation, the addition of passenger door control buttons, and the replacement of the previous single-arm pantograph with two lozenge-type pantographs on the DeHa 7600 car.

Formations
As of 1 April 2014, the fleet consists of seven three-car sets, formed as follows, with two motored ("M") cars and one non-powered trailer ("T") car.

The DeHa 7600 car is fitted with two lozenge-type pantographs.

History

The first three-car train, 7501, entered service on 25 March 2010.

A second three-car set, 7502, was delivered in October 2010, and entered revenue service from 24 December 2010.

Build details
The conversion histories and former identities of the fleet are as shown below.

Special liveries
From September until November 2014, set 7502 carried a special "Geo Park Train" livery featuring wildlife formerly associated with the area.

References

External links

 Chichibu Railway news release (2 March 2010) 
 Chichibu Railway 7500 series (Japan Railfan Magazine Online) 

Electric multiple units of Japan
Train-related introductions in 2010
Chichibu Railway
Tokyu Car multiple units
1500 V DC multiple units of Japan